"Raising Hell" is a song by Welsh heavy metal band Bullet for My Valentine. It was released on 18 November 2013 as a promotional single to showcase what the band's future material would sound like. The song is featured as a deluxe edition bonus track on the band's fifth album Venom. This is the final song that featured Jason James on bass after the band and him parted ways in February 2015.

Background
On 13 November 2013, Bullet for My Valentine revealed through their official Facebook page they were working on a new song. A short snippet of the song was released on Matt Tuck's Vine profile on 15 November 2013. The song was first played on 18 November 2013 via BBC Radio 1's Rock Show. It was made available for streaming on 20 November 2013. A music video for the song was released a week later.

Personnel
 Matthew Tuck - lead vocals, rhythm guitar
 Michael "Padge" Paget – lead guitar, backing vocals
 Michael "Moose" Thomas – drums, percussion
 Jason "Jay" James – bass guitar, backing vocals

Chart

References

2013 singles
Bullet for My Valentine songs
2013 songs
Songs written by Matthew Tuck
Songs written by Michael Paget
Songs written by Jason James (musician)